"Wie es geht" ("How to do it", lit. "How it goes") is a punk song by Die Ärzte. It is the first track and the first single from their 2000 album Runter mit den Spendierhosen, Unsichtbarer!. The singer addresses a woman, trying several times to tell her "I love you", but keeps on ending up saying "(I just don't know) how to do it"; at the end of the song he finally manages to say the words.

The packaging of the single was made to resemble a cheap, consumer level CD-R and alludes to music piracy.

The video 

In the video, most of the time, the band is performing the song on a yacht. Other scenes include the band driving a motorboat and Farin singing to different women.

Track listing 

 "Wie es geht" (Urlaub) - 3:40
 "Poser, du bist ein..." (Felsenheimer) - 2:00
 "Die Instrumente des Orchesters" (Urlaub) - 2:36
 "Kpt. Blaubär (Extended Version)" (Urlaub, Felsenheimer, Gonzalez) - 4:17
 "Halsabschneider" (Urlaub) - 1:28

B-sides 

"Poser, du bist ein..." ("Poser, you are a...") criticises people who want all the attention.
"Die Instrumente des Orchesters" ("The instruments of the orchestra") is an ode to the guitar, which is not included on the vinyl single.
"Kpt. Blaubär" ("Cpt. Bluebear") is about a seaman who tells made-up and exaggerated stories (Käpt'n. Blaubär is a popular German cartoon character; the song is a longer version of the one on the soundtrack of "Käpt'n Blaubär", which is titled "Bleib sauber, Blaubär").
"Halsabschneider" ("Neckchopper") is a song against Jörg Haider.

Charts

Weekly charts

Year-end charts

References

2000 singles
Die Ärzte songs
Songs written by Farin Urlaub
2000 songs